Events in the year 1676 in Norway.

Incumbents
Monarch: Christian V

Events
Norwegian forces led by Ulrik Frederik Gyldenløve invades Bohuslen from Norway.

Arts and literature

Births

Deaths
August – Niels Hanssøn Meng, timber trader and Mayor (born 1604).

See also

References